The Bahamas competed at the 1962 British Empire and Commonwealth Games in Perth, Western Australia, from 22 November to 1 December 1962.

Medalists

Athletics

Men
Track events

Key
Note–Ranks given for track events are within the athlete's heat only
Q = Qualified for the next round

References

Nations at the 1962 British Empire and Commonwealth Games
1962
British Empire and Commonwealth Games